Boyd Stuart Leedom (1906 – August 11, 1969) was a justice of the South Dakota Supreme Court from 1951 to 1955, and a member of the National Labor Relations Board from 1955 to 1964.

Leedom, a Republican, was appointed to the NLRB by President Dwight D. Eisenhower, and served as its chair February 11, 1955 to June 3, 1961. He continued on the NLRB as a member until December 16, 1964. After Stanley Forman Reed resigned from the Supreme Court early in 1957, it was suggested by the Pennington County Republican organization and subsequently by Representative Ellis Yarnal Berry that Leedom be named as his replacement. Leedom′s candidacy was not discussed outside South Dakota and neighbouring localities, while the seat ultimately went to Charles Evans Whittaker of the Eighth Circuit.

References

1906 births
1969 deaths
Justices of the South Dakota Supreme Court
South Dakota Republicans
National Labor Relations Board officials
20th-century American judges
Eisenhower administration personnel
Kennedy administration personnel
Lyndon B. Johnson administration personnel